Casminola yoshimotoi is a moth in the family Nolidae. It was discovered by Hiroshi Inoue in 2000. The moth is found in Taiwan and Thailand.

The wingspan is 15–16 mm. The wings are white, the forewings with a brownish hue. The hindwings are white and almost unmarked.

References

Moths described in 2000
Nolinae